Salmiyarvi is a rural locality (a Posyolok) in Pechengsky District of Murmansk Oblast, Russia. The village is located beyond the Arctic circle. Located at a height of 70 m above sea level.

References

Rural localities in Murmansk Oblast